The Extraordinary and Plenipotentiary Ambassador of Peru to the Republic of Trinidad and Tobago is the official representative of the Republic of Peru to the Republic of Trinidad and Tobago.

The ambassador in Port of Spain is accredited to neighbouring countries, such as Guyana, member states of CARICOM, and Barbados, Saint Lucia and Saint Vincent and the Grenadines. Peru formerly maintained an embassy in Kingston, Jamaica, but closed it in 2008, along with other embassies.

Both countries established relations in 1968 and have maintained them since. The Peruvian embassy in Port of Spain was opened in the 1990s. It was closed at one point but reopened in 2014.

List of representatives

See also
List of ambassadors of Peru to Jamaica
List of ambassadors of Peru to Venezuela

Notes

References

Trinidad and Tobago
Peru